The Matanzas Formation is a geologic formation in Cuba. It preserves fossils dating back to the Late Pliocene period.

Fossil content 
 Porites baracoaensis
 Agaricia dominicensis
 Madracis mirabilis
 Stylophora granulata
 Thysanus excentricus

See also 
 List of fossiliferous stratigraphic units in Cuba

References

Further reading 
 
 T. W. Vaughan. 1919. Fossil corals from central America, Cuba, and Porto Rico, with an account of the American Tertiary, Pleistocene, and Recent coral reefs. Smithsonian Institution Bulletin 103:189-524

Geologic formations of Cuba
Neogene Cuba
Marl formations
Reef deposits
Formations